Keller Group plc is a geotechnical engineering company. It is listed on the London Stock Exchange and is a constituent of the FTSE 250 Index. The company is the world's largest geotechnical specialist contractor. It announced, in January 2023, that an "apparently sophisticated" fraud had been found at one of its subsidiaries.

History
The company was established in the 1950s as the ground engineering division of GKN plc. In 1960, it expanded into a stand-alone piling and ground improvement company and, in 1975, it acquired the German company Johann Keller and took on that name. In 1984 Keller bought Hayward Baker Inc., a US ground engineering business. In 1990 it was the subject of a management buy-out from GKN plc supported by Candover and it was first listed on the London Stock Exchange in May 1994. In 2006, Keller Group acquired Anderson Drilling, the creaters and owners of the Big Stan drilling rig. In 2007, the company sold its social housing division for nominal consideration; also in 2007 the company acquired HJ Foundation for £24.5 million.

In January 2023, Keller published a profit warning after a "deliberate and sophisticated financial reporting fraud" at Austral Construction. The estimated impact was £6m related to the first half of 2022, and £8m to £10m relating to prior years. Two directors were dismissed as investigations continued, and the company's shares fell 10%. The fraud was described by The Times as "apparently sophisticated". Keller's pre-tax profit for 2022 fell by 17% as a result; it made £56m profit across the year, from a turnover of £2.9bn.

Operations
Keller operates under three divisions and is supported by its group head office:
 North America: Bencor, Case Foundation, Hayward Baker, HJ Foundation, Keller Canada, McKinney Drilling, Suncoast, Moretrench. With effect from 1 January 2020, these businesses were all branded as Keller and operate as regional parts of a single company.
 Europe, Middle East and Africa: Central Europe, North-East Europe, North-West Europe, South-East Europe, Franki, French Speaking Countries, Middle East, Iberia and Latin America, Brazil
 Asia-Pacific: ASEAN, India, Keller Australia and Austral Construction.

The company has been involved in laying foundations for complex projects including High Speed 2 in the UK and the Spirit Tower in Australia.

See also
 British Geotechnical Association

References

External links

Companies based in the City of Westminster
Companies listed on the London Stock Exchange
Construction and civil engineering companies of the United Kingdom
Geotechnical engineering companies
1950 establishments in England
British companies established in 1950
Construction and civil engineering companies established in 1950